Fishpond is an unincorporated community in Coosa County, Alabama, United States.

References

Unincorporated communities in Coosa County, Alabama
Unincorporated communities in Alabama